Cop and Speeder is the second studio album by American alternative rock band Heatmiser, released in 1994 by record label Frontier.

Reception 

Like its predecessor, Cop and Speeder received generally mixed reviews from critics.

Trouser Press wrote, "Heatmiser attains a powerful sense of mood on Cop and Speeder [...] Thanks to improved songwriting, the album finds the band beginning to emerge from its flat monochrome tones."

Track listing

Personnel 
 Heatmiser

 Neil Gust – vocals, guitar, production, packaging, sleeve photography
 Tony Lash – drums, production, engineering, mixing, mastering
 Brandt Peterson – bass guitar
 Elliott Smith – vocals, guitar, production, sleeve photography

 Technical

 Bob Stark – additional engineering
 Peter Gries – additional engineering
 Kevin Nettleingham – additional engineering
 Steve "Thee Slayer Hippy" Hanford – co-production
 John Golden – mastering
 J.J. Gonson – sleeve photography
 Kelly O'Mara – sleeve photography
 Peter Hawkinson – technical assistance

References 

1994 albums
Heatmiser albums
Frontier Records albums
Cavity Search Records albums